George Freeman Haines, Jr. (August 2, 1921 – January 14, 2018) was a professional basketball player who spent one season as a member of the Pittsburgh Raiders in the National Basketball League (NBL) during the 1944–45 season. He attended Bucknell University, where he was named the Associated Press All-Pennsylvania Team during the 1942 season. He graduated during the summer of 1943 with a degree of chemical engineering. Academically he made the Dean's list and was the president of the senior class at Bucknell.

References

External links
Career statistics and player information from Basketball-Reference.com

1921 births
2018 deaths
American men's basketball players
Basketball players from Pennsylvania
Bucknell Bison men's basketball players
Pittsburgh Raiders players
Sportspeople from Bethlehem, Pennsylvania
University of Pittsburgh alumni